Turkistan (Türkıstan) is a city and the administrative center of Turkistan Region of Kazakhstan, near the Syr Darya river. The city is served by Hazrat Sultan International Airport.

In 2021, Turkistan was proclaimed by the Organization of Turkic States as "Spiritual Capital of the Turkic World". In the same year, Turkistan was named as one of the top ten tourist destinations in Kazakhstan.

History

Turkistan, one of Kazakhstan's historic cities, has an archaeological record dating back to the 4th century.

It became a commercial centre after the final demise of Otrar, the medieval city whose ruins lie near the Syr Darya to the southeast. Throughout most of the medieval and early-modern period it was known as Iasy or Shavgar and after the 16th-17th centuries as Turkistan or Hazrat, both of which names derive from the title 'Hazrat-i Turkistan', which literally means "the Saint (or Blessed One) of Turkistan" and refers to Khoja Akhmet Yassawi, the Sufi Sheikh of Turkistan, who lived here during the 11th century and is buried in the town.

Because of his influence and in his memory, the city became an important centre of spirituality and Islamic learning for the peoples of the Kazakh steppes. In the 1390s, Turco-Mongol warlord and the founder of the Timurid dynasty Timur erected a magnificent domed Mazar or tomb over his grave, which remains the most significant architectural monument in the Republic of Kazakhstan. It was pictured on the back of the banknotes of the national currency until 2006.

Other important historical sites in the city include a medieval bath-house and four other mausoleums, one dedicated to Rabiya Sultan Begim, who was Timur's great granddaughter, and three to Kazakh khans (rulers).

Before the Russians came in the 19th century, Turkistan lay on the frontier of the settled Perso-Islamic oasis culture of Transoxiana to the south, and the world of the Kazakh steppes to the north. 

In the 16th to 18th centuries, Turkistan became the capital of the Kazakh Khanate. It became the political center of the Kazakh steppe, but after advancing conquest expeditions of the Russian Empire and the associated weakening of the Kazakh Khanate benefited small southern states which were captured. Finally, this city was conquered in Kokand khanate by Russian General Veryovkin in 1864. When Turkistan fell to the Russian Empire, it was incorporated into the Syr-Darya Oblast of the Governor-Generalship of Russian Turkistan. When the Tsarist regime fell in 1917-18 it was briefly part of the Turkistan Autonomous Soviet Socialist Republic before being part of the Kazakh ASSR within Soviet Russia in 1924.

On 19 June 2018 Shymkent was taken out of South Kazakhstan Region and subordinated directly to the government of Kazakhstan. The administrative centre of the region moved to Turkistan and the region was renamed the Turkistan Region.

In 2021, it was announced that the first 5G city will be set up in Turkistan. This project will be sponsored by Kcell and Ericsson.

Pilgrimage

The city attracts thousands of pilgrims. According to a regional tradition, three pilgrimages to Turkistan are equivalent to one hajj to Mecca (such local piety is known also in relation to other religious monuments in the Muslim world). The Saint was held in such reverence that the city was known as the Second Mecca of the East, a vision which has helped shape the spiritual identity of Muslims in Kazakhstan.

Demographics
Turkistan had a population of 165,000 in the 2019 census. The population rose by 10% from 1989 to 99, making it the second fastest-growing town in Kazakhstan, after the new capital Astana.

The ethnic composition of the city:
Kazakhs – 52.5%
Uzbeks – 45.2%
Other ethnic groups – 2.3%

The ethnic composition of the city according to the 1897 census:
total – 11,253 	
Uzbeks – 8,940 (79.4%)
Kazakhs – 1,415 (12.5%)
Tatars – 506 (4.4%)
Russians – 312 (2.7%)

At the same time the ethnic composition of the Chimkent uyezd (Chimkent district) which included the city of Turkistan according to the 1897 census:

total – 285,059 	
Kazakhs – 224,704 (78.8%)
Sart (non-nomadic Iranic, Turkic, or Mongolic people)– 32 043 (11.2%)
Uzbeks – 20,709 (7.2%)
Russians – 6 443 (2.2%)
Tatars – 646 (0.2%)

Tourism
In 2021, Keruen-Saray, Central Asia’s largest tourism complex, was opened in Turkistan. This unique attraction features merchants, artisans, a flying theater, an amphitheater for equestrian shows, a bazaar, hotels, restaurants, a spa and fitness center, a cinema, and a family entertainment center.

Transport
The city transport in Turkistan consists of buses and taxis.

Turkistan is served by Hazrat Sultan International Airport. It is located  NE from the centre of city.

Geography and climate
Turkistan may be reached by train from Almaty, in a journey of nearly 20 hours. The road trip from the nearest airport at Shymkent takes about two hours.

Turkistan experiences a cool semi-arid climate (Köppen BSk) with short, cold winters and long, dry, very hot summers. The vast majority of the annual precipitation falls between late autumn and late spring.

Twin towns – sister cities
 Afyonkarahisar, Turkey
 Keçiören, Turkey
 Shusha, Azerbaijan

See also
Mausoleum of Khoja Ahmed Yasawi

Footnotes

References

Hill, John E. (2009) Through the Jade Gate to Rome: A Study of the Silk Routes during the Later Han Dynasty, 1st to 2nd Centuries CE. BookSurge, Charleston, South Carolina. .
Hulsewé, A. F. P. and Loewe, M. A. N. 1979. China in Central Asia: The Early Stage 125 BC – AD 23: an annotated translation of chapters 61 and 96 of the History of the Former Han Dynasty. E. J. Brill, Leiden. .
 
Privratsky, Bruce G. (2001). Muslim Turkistan: Kazak Religion and Collective Memory Curzon Press, Richmond, Surrey UK.

External links

Description of archaeological investigations

Archaeological sites in Kazakhstan
Cities and towns in Kazakhstan
Holy cities
Islamic pilgrimages
Populated places along the Silk Road
Populated places in Turkistan Region